Anton Müller (born 22 October 1983 in West Berlin) is a German footballer who plays as a midfielder for Rostocker FC.

Career

Müller spent his early career in his hometown of Berlin, before joining Hansa Rostock in 2003. Initially a reserve team player, he was promoted to the first-team in 2005, and made his 2. Bundesliga debut in a 1–0 defeat to Karlsruher SC as a substitute for Denis Lapaczinski. Müller would go on to make three more appearances that season (one in the DFB-Pokal), but none the following year, and left the club in 2007 to sign for Chemnitzer FC of the NOFV-Oberliga Süd. He helped the club earn promotion to the Regionalliga Nord in his first season, and a year later, he signed for SV Babelsberg 03 of the same division. Another promotion followed – Babelsberg won the title in 2010, and promotion to the 3. Liga, but after another year Müller was on the move again, signing for Hallescher FC. His first season in Halle ended in a second Regionalliga Nord title, and a return to the 3. Liga. After two seasons at this level, he signed for FC Schönberg 95 of the NOFV-Oberliga Nord.

References

External links 
 

1983 births
Living people
Footballers from Berlin
German footballers
Association football midfielders
2. Bundesliga players
3. Liga players
Tennis Borussia Berlin players
Füchse Berlin Reinickendorf players
FC Hansa Rostock players
Chemnitzer FC players
SV Babelsberg 03 players
Hallescher FC players